Veronika Maria Bellmann (née Wächter; born 20 November 1960 in Chemnitz, then Karl-Marx-Stadt in East Germany) is a German politician and member of the CDU.

She was Member of the German Bundestag for Mittelsachsen from 2002 until 2021, in which she lost her seat to Carolin Bachmann from the AfD.

References

External links 
 
  

1960 births
Living people
People from Chemnitz
People from Bezirk Karl-Marx-Stadt
Members of the Bundestag for Saxony
Female members of the Bundestag
21st-century German women politicians
Members of the Bundestag 2017–2021
Members of the Bundestag 2013–2017
Members of the Bundestag 2009–2013
Members of the Bundestag 2005–2009
Members of the Bundestag 2002–2005
Members of the Bundestag for the Christian Democratic Union of Germany
20th-century German women